Joaquín Montes (born 23 June 1979 in Montevideo) is a professional rugby union referee who represents the Uruguayan Rugby Union (URU) at the international level in refereeing.

Career
Montes takes charge of both Campeonato Uruguayo de Rugby and Nacional de Clubes matches regularly.

In 2011, he refereed the Final of the 2011 IRB Junior World Rugby Trophy between Samoa and Japan.

On 26 June 2012, the Uruguayan Rugby Union named him as an international rugby union referee. After his nomination, his first international tournament of relevance involved was the 3rd edition of the Americas Rugby Championship in October of the same, held in Canada.

In November 2013, he refereed his first test match between Spain and Japan.

References

1979 births
Living people
Uruguayan rugby union referees
Sportspeople from Montevideo